Miguel Guzmán Huerta (1916 – December 1, 1973) was a Mexican professional wrestler, or Luchador as they are known in Spanish, who worked under the ring names Miguel Guzmán and Black Guzmán, a nickname he had earned due to his tan skin color. Guzmán was the brother of Rodolfo Guzmán Huerta, better known as the wrestling legend "El Santo", as well as the brother of wrestlers Pantera Negra and Jimmy Guzmán. He was the uncle of El Hijo del Santo and the great uncle of Axel. Guzmán style was centered on the headscissors, pioneering several variations of the Headscissors takedown, and was one of the first Luchadors to work a fast-paced, aerial style. Guzmán was the first Mexican National Light Heavyweight Champion, winning a tournament in 1943. Guzmán also competed for Texas-based Southwest Sports, Inc. for a number of years, including eight reigns as the NWA Texas Heavyweight Champion and one run with the NWA Texas Tag Team Championship alongside Rito Romero.

Biography
Guzmán was born in 1916 in Tulancingo in the Mexican state of Hidalgo, to Jesús Guzmán Campos and Josefina Huerta Márquez as the fourth of seven children. The family moved to Mexico City in the 1920s in order go earn a living. When old enough Guzmán began training for his professional wrestling career alongside his younger brother Rodolfo.

Professional wrestling career
Guzmán made his professional wrestling debut in the early 1930s working under his real name. He quickly earned the nickname "Black Guzmán", due to his dark skin. He also earned the nickname "Indio de Tulacingo" (Spanish for "Indian from Tulacingo"). Black Guzmán was initially a bigger star than his younger brother Rodolfo as he pioneered a high flying, fast-paced style of wrestling focused around the Headscissors takedown. His fame was later surpassed by Rodolfo, who adopted the name "El Santo". On December 16, 1941, Black Guzmán defeated Tarzán López to win the World Middleweight Championship, one of the top titles in Mexico at the time. Guzmán only held the title for 57 days before López regained it. Two years later Guzmán won a tournament to become the first ever Mexican National Light Heavyweight Championship in March. Guzmán held the title until September 20, 1944, when he lost the title to Gorilla Ramos.

By the mid-1940s Guzmán had started working across the border in Texas for Southwest Sports, Inc. (Later World Class Championship Wrestling), run by Ed McLemore. In Texas he was billed as "Miguel Guzmán" and despite being a bit older and a bit slower than when he headlined in Mexico he still held several championships and headlined several cards throughout the 1940s and 1950s. He won his first Texas based title on August 1, 1947, when he defeated Sonny Myers for the vacant Texas Heavyweight Championship. Guzmán would win the title an additional two times before Southwest Sports, Inc. joined the National Wrestling Alliance, renaming the title the "NWA Texas Heavyweight Championship". Guzmán would win the title a total of eight times, defeating Yukon Eric, Danny McShain, Wild Red Berry, Sonny Myers, Danny Savish and Wayne Martin for the title. Guzmán vacated the title in 1951 due to injuries. Guzmán was also a successful tag team competitor, teaming with Rito Romero to win the Texas Tag Team Championship on three separate occasions. The team defeated Al Lovelock and Danny McShain to win the title the first time, losing them to Duke Keomuka and Danny Savich in November 1950. On April 4, 1951, Guzman wrestled then World Heavyweight Champion (LA Version) "Baron" Michele Leone at the Los Angeles Olympic Auditorium. The match was in front of a sold-out crowd of 10,400 and ended in a 60-minute time limit draw. On February 1, 1952, Guzmán teamed with Ray Gunkel to hold the Texas Tag Team title for three weeks. Guzmán and Romero joined forces twice more to win the Tag Team title, defeating Duke Keomuka and Mr. Moto. The team ended their third and final run with the title in May 1954, when they lost to Ivan Kamlikoff and Karol Krauser.

Guzmán's career slowed down by the mid-1950s, and he retired in the 1960s. On December 1, 1973, Guzmán died.

A famous Lucha family
Guzmán is part of an extende Lucha Libre family that includes Guzmán's brother Rodolfo who is better known as the "El Santo" and Rodolfo's son still wrestles as "El Hijo del Santo". His brothers also wrestled as "Pantera Negra" and Jimmy Guzmán. Guzmán is the great uncle of wrestlers Axxel and Rocker II.

Championships and accomplishments
Empresa Mexicana de la Lucha Libre
Mexican National Light Heavyweight Championship (1 time)
World Middleweight Championship (1 time)
Southwest Sports, Inc.
NWA Texas Heavyweight Championship (8 times)
NWA Texas Tag Team Championship (4 times) – with Rito Romero (3) and Ray Gunkel

References

1916 births
1973 deaths
Mexican male professional wrestlers
Professional wrestlers from Hidalgo (state)
People from Tulancingo
Mexican National Middleweight Champions
NWA World Middleweight Champions
Mexican National Light Heavyweight Champions